Olivella millepunctata is a species of small sea snail, marine gastropod mollusk in the subfamily Olivellinae, in the family Olividae, the olives.  Species in the genus Olivella are commonly called dwarf olives.

Description
The length of the shell varies between 9 mm and 16 mm.

Distribution
This species occurs in the Atlantic Ocean off West Africa, off Gabon and Angola.

References

 Duclos P.L. 1840. Histoire naturelle générale et particulière de tous les genres de coquilles univalves marines a l'état vivant et fossile publiée par monographie. Genre Columbella, 1 p., 13 pls. Didot, Paris, page(s): plate 25 fig 1–4.

millepunctata
Gastropods described in 1840